Irish Sign Language (ISL) is the sign language of Ireland, used primarily in the Republic of Ireland. It is also used in Northern Ireland, alongside British Sign Language (BSL). Irish Sign Language is more closely related to French Sign Language (LSF) than to BSL, though it has influence from both languages. It has influenced sign languages in Australia and South Africa, and has little relation to either spoken Irish or English. ISL is unique among sign languages for having different gendered versions due to men and women being taught it at different schools.

Development
The Irish Deaf Society says that ISL "arose from within deaf communities", "was developed by deaf people themselves" and "has been in existence for hundreds of years". According to Ethnologue, the language has influence from both LSF and BSL, as well as from signed French and signed English, BSL having been introduced in Dublin in 1816. The first school for deaf children in Ireland was established in 1816 by Dr. Charles Orpen. The Claremont Institution was a Protestant institution and given that Ireland was a part of the United Kingdom, it is no surprise that BSL (or some version of signed English based in BSL) was used for teaching and learning (Pollard 2006). McDonnell (1979) reports that the Irish institutions - Catholic and Protestant - did not teach the children to speak and it was not until 1887 that Claremont report changing from a manual to an oral approach. For the Catholic schools, the shift to oralism came later: St. Mary's School for Deaf Girls moved to an oral approach in 1946 and St. Joseph's School for Deaf Boys shifted to oralism in 1956, though this did not become formal state policy until 1972. Sign language use was seriously suppressed and religion was used to further stigmatise the language (e.g. children were encouraged to give up signing for Lent and sent to confession if caught signing). The fact that the Catholic schools are segregated on the basis of gender led to the development of a gendered-generational variant of Irish Sign Language that is still evident (albeit to a lesser degree) today.

ISL was brought by Catholic missionaries to Australia, and to Scotland and England, with remnants of ISL still visible in some variants of BSL, especially in Glasgow, and with some elderly Auslan Catholics still using ISL today. In South Africa, the Dominican nuns who established Catholic Schools saw a need for a school for the deaf, but due to resource constraints were not in a position to do this immediately. Instead, they wrote back to their Mother House in Cabra requesting an experienced teacher of the deaf. A deaf teacher, Bridget Lynne, responded. Remnants of gendered generational Irish Sign Language are thought to still be visible in some dialects of South African Sign Language, which can probably be traced back to Lynne.

Oireachtas bill
The "Recognition of Irish Sign Language for the Deaf Community Bill 2016" passed all stages in the Oireachtas (Irish Parliament) on 14 December 2017, and was signed into law under the revised title, The Irish Sign Language Act 2017. The Act was signed into law by the President of Ireland Michael D Higgins on 24 December 2017. The Act, which commenced on December 23rd, 2020, requires that public services are available through ISL and also outlines the need for greater access to education through sign language. Prior to the passage, there was no automatic right for deaf people to have an ISL interpreter (except for criminal court proceedings). For the deaf community, recognition of ISL means more legal rights and better access to public services - including education, healthcare, media and banking.

Language code
The ISO 639-3 code for Irish Sign Language is 'isg'; 'isl' is the code for Icelandic.

See also
Irish manual alphabet
Lámh
Auslan
Australian Irish Sign Language
Northern Ireland Sign Language
South African Sign Language

References

Bibliography
 Crean, E, J. (1997):  Breaking the silence: The education of the deaf in Ireland 1816-1996. Dublin: Irish Deaf Society Publication.
 Department of Education (1972): The Education of Children who are Handicapped by Impaired Hearing. Dublin: Government Publications.
 Grehan, C. (2008): Communication Islands: The Impact of Segregation on Attitudes to ISL among a Sample of Graduates of St. Mary's School for Deaf Girls. Unpublished M.Phil. dissertation. School of Linguistic, Speech and Communication Sciences. Dublin: Trinity College.
 Griffey, N. (1994): From Silence to Speech: Fifty years with the Deaf. Dublin: Dominican Publications.
 Leeson, L. (2005). Vying with Variation: Interpreting Language Contact, Gender Variation and Generational Difference. In T. Janzen (ed.) Topics in Signed Language Interpreting. Amsterdam and Philadelphia: John Benjamins. 251–292.
Leeson, L. and C. Grehan (2004): "To The Lexicon and Beyond: The Effect of Gender on Variation in Irish Sign Language". In Van Herreweghe, Mieke and Myriam Vermeerbergen (eds.): To the Lexicon and Beyond: Sociolinguistics in European Deaf Communities. Washington DC: Gallaudet University Press. 39–73.
 Leeson, L. and J. I. Saeed (2012) Irish Sign Language. Edinburgh: Edinburgh University Press. 
 LeMaster, B. (1990): The Maintenance and Loss of Female and Male Signs in the Dublin Deaf Community. Ann Arbor: U.M.I .: University of California, Los Angeles Dissertation.
 Leonard, C. (2005): "Signs of diversity: use and recognition of gendered signs among your Irish Deaf people". In: Deaf Worlds 21:2. 62–77.
 McDonnell, P. (1979): The Establishment and Operation of Institutions for the Education of the Deaf in Ireland, 1816-1889. Unpublished essay submitted in part-fulfillment of the requirements of the award of the degree of Master in Education. Dublin: University College Dublin.
 McDonnell, P. and Saunders, H. (1993): "Sit on Your Hands: Strategies to Prevent Signing". In Fischer, R. and Lane, H. (eds.) Looking Back: A Reader on the History of Deaf Communities and their Sign Languages. Hamburg: Signum. 255–260.
 Pollard, Rachel (2006): The Avenue. Dublin: Denzille Press.
 Rose, Heath and John Bosco Conama. 2018. Linguistic imperialism: still a valid construct in relation to language policy for Irish Sign Language.  Language Policy  Volume 17, Issue 3, pp 385–404.

External links
Irish Deaf Society
Centre for Deaf Studies, TCD

Languages of the Republic of Ireland
Languages of Northern Ireland
Sign languages of the United Kingdom
French Sign Language family
Deaf culture in Ireland